Cryptognatha is a genus of lady beetles in the family Coccinellidae. There are at least three described species in Cryptognatha.

Species
These three species belong to the genus Cryptognatha:
 Cryptognatha auriculata Mulsant, 1850
 Cryptognatha gemelata Mulsant, 1850
 Cryptognatha nodiceps Marshall, 1912 (coconut scale predator)

References

Further reading

 
 

Coccinellidae
Coccinellidae genera
Taxa named by Étienne Mulsant
Articles created by Qbugbot